Ekstrand is a Swedish surname. Notable people with the surname include:

Gunnar Ekstrand (1892–1966), Swedish Olympic diver
Joel Ekstrand (born 1989), Swedish footballer
Ulf Ekstrand (born 1957), Swedish Olympic ice speed skater
Yngve Ekstrand (1888–1951), Swedish naval officer 

Swedish-language surnames